The Roman Catholic Diocese of Coutances (–Avranches) (Latin: Dioecesis Constantiensis (–Abrincensis); French: Diocèse de Coutances (–Avranches))  is a diocese of the Roman Catholic Church in France. Its mother church is the Cathedral of Coutance in the commune of Coutances in France. The diocese is suffragan of the Archbishop of Rouen and comprises the entire department of Manche. It was enlarged in 1802 by the addition of the former Diocese of Avranches and of two archdeaconries from the Diocese of Bayeux.  Since 1854 its bishops have held the title of Bishop of Coutances (–Avranches).

The Bishop of Coutances exercised ecclesiastical jurisdiction over the Channel Islands, mostly in Alderney where the Bishop also held partial authority over the Leader of Alderney, until the Reformation, despite the secular division of Normandy in 1204. The final rupture occurred definitively in 1569 when Queen Elizabeth I demanded that the Bishops hand the island over to the Bishop of Winchester.

History of the Diocese of Coutances
In 1757 the city of Coutances had a population of about 12,000 Catholics. The Cathedral was dedicated to the Virgin Mary.  Its Chapter was composed of eight dignities (the Cantor, four Archdeacons, the Scholasticus, the Treasurer, and the Penitentiary) and twenty-five Canons. There were also six Choral Vicars, forty-two chaplains, fourteen choristers and six boy singers, and a body of musicians.  The Cantor has existed from the 11th century.  The four archdeacons were: Coutances, Baptois, Val-de-Vire and Cotentin. In the city were two parishes (Saint-Pierre and Saint-Nicolas), two houses of male religious, and two monasteries of monks.  The entire diocese had some 500 parishes.

The diocese contained seven houses of Benedictine monks:  Saint-Sever, Lessay, Saint-Sauveur le Vicomte, Montebourg, Hambie, Notre-Dame de Protection (Valognes, 1626, women), and Notre-Dame des Anges (Coutances, 1633, women).  There was a house of Premonstratensians at Blanchelande; and two houses of Augustinians, at Saint-Lô and Notre-Dame de Voeu at Cherbourg.  All were abolished by will of the Constituent Assembly in 1790, and their properties confiscated and sold.  Monastic vows were dissolved and forbidden. On 12 April 1791 the priests of the seminary were expelled for refusing to take the Oath to the Constitution. On 15 January 1793 the turn came of the houses of women to be closed and confiscated, and their inhabitants forcibly ejected.

History of the Diocese of Avranches

The Cathedral of Avranches, situated in a town of some 2500 inhabitants in 1764, was dedicated to Saint Andrew on 17 September 1211.  The Chapter of the Cathedral had six dignities (the Dean, the Cantor, the Treasurer, the Scholasticus and the two Archdeacons) and eighteen Canons. The archdeacons were named Archidiaconus Abricensis and Archidiaconus Vallis Moretonii. The town contained three parishes, one community of male religious and one monastery of monks.  The entire diocese contained 170 parishes.

The Diocese of Avranches was abolished during the French Revolution by the Legislative Assembly, under the Civil Constitution of the Clergy (1790). Its territory was subsumed into the new diocese, called 'Manche', with its seat at Coutances, which was part of the Metropolitanate called the 'Côtes de la Manche' (which included eight new 'départements'), with its seat at Rouen (Seine-Inférieure).  When the Concordat of 1801 was struck between Pope Pius VII and First Consul Bonaparte, the Diocese of Avranches was not revived.

List of bishops

Bishops of Coutances

to 1050

Ereptiolus, c. 430–473
Exuperus (or Exuperatus), c. 473–500
Leontianus, c.500–512
Possessor, c. 512–523
Lauto (Saint-Lô), c. 525–565
Romacharius (Rumpharius), c. 566–600 ?
Saint Ursinus
Ulfobertus, c. 600–610
Lupicinus, c. 610–640
Nepus
Chairibonus, attested 650
Waldomar (or Baldomer), c. 650–660
Hulderic, c. 660–674
Frodemundus, 677–690
Wilbert (or Aldebert)
Agathius
Livin
Wilfrid
Joshua
Leon
Angulon
Hubert
Willard, c. 820– c. 840
Herluin, c. 840–862
Sigenand (or Seginand), c. 862–880
Lista (or Listus), c. 880–888/90
Raguenard, c. 898–???
Herlebaud (or Erleboldus)
Agebert

Bishops in exile at Rouen
Theodoric (Thierry), c. 911
Herbert I
Algerund (Algeronde)
Gilbert (Gillebert)
Hugues I (Hugh), c. 989–1025

Bishops in Saint–Lô
Herbert II, c. 1025–1026, left Rouen and installed himself at Saint–Lô
Robert I, c. 1026–1048, also bishop of Lisieux

from 1050 to 1400

Geoffrey de Montbray, 1049–1093
Raoul, 1093–1110
Roger, c. 1114–1123
Richard de Brix (alias de Bruce), 1124–1131
Algare (Algarus, Algardus or Algarius), 1132–1151, previously prior of Bodmin
Richard de Bohon, 1151–1179
Guillaume de Tournebu, 1184–1202
Vivien de L'Étang (de L'Estang), 1202–1208
Hugues de Morville, 1208–1238, principal restorer of the cathedral
Gilles de Caen (or Gilon), 1246–1248
Jean d'Essay, 1251–1274
Eustache, O.Min., 1282–1291
Robert de Harcourt, 1291–1315
Guillaume de Thieuville, 1315–1345
Louis Herpin d'Erquery, 1346–1370
Sylvestre de La Cervelle, 1371–1386
Nicolas de Tholon (Toulon), 1386–1387 (Avignon Obedience)
Guillaume de Crèvecoeur, 1387–1408

from 1400 to 1600

Aegidius (Gilles des Champs), 1408–1413 (Appointed by Alexander V) 
Jean de Marle, 1414–1418
Pandolfo Malatesta, 1418–1424, present at the Council of Constance
Philibert de Montjeu, 1424–1439, present at the Council of Basel
Gilles de Duremort, O.Cist. 1439–1444, judge in the trial of Joan of Arc
Giovanni Castiglione, 1444–1453
Richard Olivier de Longueil, 1453–1470, made a cardinal in 1456.
Benoît de Montferrand, 1470–1476
Cardinal Giuliano della Rovere, 1476–1477, non-resident, became Pope in 1503.
Galeazzo della Rovere, 1477–1478, non-resident, became bishop of Agen
Geoffroy Herbert, 1478–1510
Adrien Gouffier de Boissy, 1510–1519, cardinal
Bernard Dovizi da Bibbiena, 1519–1520, Administrator
René de Bresche de La Trémoïlle, 1519–1529, abbot of Flavigny
Philippe de Cossé–Brissac, 1530–1548, non-resident
Payen Le Sueur d'Esquetot, 1549–1551
Étienne Martel de Bacqueville, 1552–1560
Arthur de Cossé–Brissac, 1560–1587
Lancelot Goyon de Matignon, 1587–1588, died just ten days after his nomination.

from 1600 to 1854
Nicolas de Briroy, 1589–1620, consecrated in 1597
Guillaume Le Blanc, 1621, died before his consecration
Jacques de Carbonnel, 1621, never consecrated
Nicolas Bourgoin, 1622–1625
Léonor I Goyon de Matignon, 1627–1646, became bishop of Lisieux
Claude Auvry, 1646–1658 
Eustache Le Clerc de Lesseville, 1658–1665
Charles–François de Loménie de Brienne, 1666–1720
Léonor II Goyon de Matignon, 1721–1757
Jacques Le Febvre du Quesnoy, 1757–1764
 Ange–François de Talaru de Chalmazel, 1764–1798
François Bécherel, 1791–1801 (Constitutional Bishop of Manche)
 Claude-Louis Rousseau 14 Apr 1802 – 3 Aug 1807
 Pierre Dupont de Poursat 3 Aug 1807 – 17 Sep 1835.
 Louis-Jean-Julien Robiou de la Tréhonnais 1 Feb 1836 – 7 Dec 1852

Bishops of Avranches

Nepos, (attested 511)
Severus c. 520
Perpetuus 533–541
Egidius 549–550
Paternus,  (died 565)
Senator (Saint Sénier), 563
Saint Leudeuald, Leodovaldus c. 580
Hildoaldus c. 614– after 627
Saint Rahentrannus, Ragertran, Ragertrannus (after 681 or 683)
Aubertus,  c. 708
Jean I c. 840
Ansegardus c. 847–c. 853
Remedius 855
Walbert c. 859–c. 862
Norgod (Norgaud) c. 990–c. 1017 or 1018
Maugis (Maingise) 1022–c. 1026
Hugo 1028–c. 1060
Jean d'Ivry (or de Bayeux) 1060–1067, in 1068 Archbishop of Rouen, son of Rodulf of Ivry
Michael I 1068–1094
Turgis (Turgise) 1094–1134
Richard de Beaufou 1134–1142
Richard de Subligny 1142–1153
Herbert II 1154–1161
Achard of St. Victor 1162–1171
Richard III 1171–1182
Guillaume I Bureau 1182–c. 1195
Guillaume II de Chemillé 1196–1198
Guillaume III Tollerment 1199–1210
Guillaume IV Bureau 1210–1236
Guillaume V de Saint-Mère-Eglise 1236–1253
Richard IV L`Ainé 1253–1257
Guillaume VI 1257–1258
Richard V L`Anglois 1259–1269
Raoul de Thiéville 1269–1292
Geoffroi Boucher 1293–1306
Nicolas de Luzarches 1307–1311
Michel II de Pontorson 1311–1312
Jean III de La Mouche 1312–1327
Jean IV de Vienne 1328–1331
Jean V Hautfune 1331–1358
Foulque Bardoul 1358–1359
Robert I de La Porte 1359–1379
Laurent de Faye 1379–1391 (Avignon Obedience)
Jean VI de Saint-Avit 1391–1442 (Avignon Obedience)
Martin Pinard 1442–1458
Jean VII Bouchard 1458–1484
Louis de Bourbon-Vendôme 1484–1510
Louis Herbert 1511–1526
Agostino Trivulzio 1526 (administrator)
Jean VIII de Langeac 1526–1532
Robert Ceneau (Robert Cénalis) 1532–1560 (also Bishop of Vence and Bishop of Riez)
Antoine Le Cirier 1561–1575
Augustin Le Cirier 1575–1580
Georges de Péricard 1583–1587
François de Péricard 1588–1639
Charles Vialart de Saint-Paul 1640–1644
Roger D'Aumont 1645–1651
Gabriel Boislève 1652–1657
Gabriel-Philippe de Froulay de Tessé 1668–1689
Fabio Brulart de Sillery 1689
Pierre Daniel Huet 1689–1699
Roland-François de Kerhoen de Coettenfau 1709–1719
César Le Blanc, O.C.S.A. 1719–1746
Pierre-Jean-Baptiste Durand de Missy 1746–1764
Raimond de Durfort 1764–1766
Joseph-François de Malide 1766–1774
Pierre-Augustin Godard de Belbeuf 1774–1790

Bishops of Coutances and Avranches
Jacques-Louis Daniel, 1854–1862
Jean-Pierre Bravard, 1862–1875
Abel-Anastase Germain, 1876–1897
Joseph Guérard, 1899–1924
Théophile-Marie Louvard, 1924–1950
Jean Guyot, 1950–1966.
Joseph Wicquart, 1966–1988
Jacques Fihey, 1989–2006
Stanislas Lalanne, 2007–2012;
Laurent Le Boulc'h, 2013−present

See also
Catholic Church in France
List of Catholic dioceses in France

Notes

Bibliography

Reference works

  (Use with caution; obsolete)
  (in Latin) 
 (in Latin)

Studies

 

 (Avranches)

External links
  Centre national des Archives de l'Église de France, L'Épiscopat francais depuis 1919 , retrieved: 2016-12-24.
Coutances from the Catholic Encyclopedia

 
 
Coutances
Dioceses established in the 4th century
Manche
4th-century establishments in Roman Gaul